"Rock with You" is a 1979 song by Michael Jackson.

Rock with You may also refer to:

 "Rock with You" (BoA song), 2003
 "Rock with You" (Basto song), 2006
 "Rock with You" (MoStack song), 2019 track from album Stacko
 "Rock with You" (Seventeen song), 2021
 "Rock with You", Ateyaba song, 2018
"Rock Witchu" (PRETTYMUCH song), 2019

See also
 "Rock with U", a song by Janet Jackson
 "Rock wit U (Awww Baby)", a song by Ashanti